Vorderer Troppelgraben is a river of Bavaria, Germany. It is a left tributary of the Swabian Rezat near Pleinfeld.

See also
List of rivers of Bavaria

References

Rivers of Bavaria
Weißenburg-Gunzenhausen
Rivers of Germany